The following article is a summary of the 1922–23 football in Mandatory Palestine. As the local football association wasn't founded until July 1928, there were no officially organized competitions during the season.

Overview 
This season saw a great rise in footballing activity throughout the country. In the Hebrew sector, footballing sections in places such as Petah Tikva, Rishon LeZion, Haifa and Hadera. were resurrected, while new football clubs were formed, including the first Hapoel club, Hapoel Tel Aviv. In the Arab sector, the first conference of Orthodox Christian clubs and societies, held in July 1923, led to the establishment of the Orthodox Club in Jaffa, with other clubs following suit in later years.

The Jerusalem Sports Club organized a cup competition, which was competed mainly by British teams, along with Maccabi Tel Aviv. The cup was won the No. 14 Squadron RAF, which was stationed in Ramleh who had beaten a Haifa Train Office Workers XI 2–1 in the final. Maccabi Tel Aviv organized a cup competition for the Hebrew teams under the name "The Hebrew Cup", which was won by Maccabi Nes Tziona,  and an 8-team league competition, which was called Mis'chakei HaBechora (lit. The Premier Games), and was played during the summer months and completed during the following season. An attempt to organize a similar league in Jerusalem, which was announced on July 1923,  was abandoned after several weeks in order to re-organize the league.

Competitions

Palestine Cup 
The competition was organized by the British operated Jerusalem Sports Club. Of the Jewish teams, only Maccabi Tel Aviv participated in the tournament, losing to Palestine General Hospital 1–7. The final was played on 7 April 1923, and was won by the No. 14 Squadron RAF team, who had beaten a Palestine Railways XI from Haifa 2–1.

Known results

The Hebrew Cup 
The competition was organized by Maccabi Tel Aviv for Hebrew clubs that were not admitted to the Palestine Cup. Nine teams competed in the competition. In order to allow Maccabi Haifa to compete without burdening the newly re-founded club with expenses, the club was given a bye to the final.

Results

Mis'chakei HaBechora
Following the successful Hebrew Cup competitions, Maccabi Tel Aviv organized a league competition for clubs from Tel Aviv area. Eight teams competed in the league, which started on 9 June 1923.  The competition was completed during the following season.

Table (as of 21 July 1923)

The Jerusalem Departments Football League
The league entered its second season, with nine teams competing. The team representing the British Gendarmerie won the league.

Final Table

Clubs founded 
 Hapoel Tel Aviv
 Harari Tel Aviv

References